Gogavan (formerly, Demurchilar) is a town in the Lori Province of Armenia on the Armenia–Georgia border.

References 

Populated places in Lori Province